Pedro Mário Soares Martínez (21 November 1925 – 12 April 2021) was a Portuguese politician, academic, and lawyer. He served as Minister of Health from 1962 to 1963 under the government of António de Oliveira Salazar.

References

1925 births
2021 deaths
Health ministers of Portugal
20th-century Portuguese lawyers
National Union (Portugal) politicians
People from Lisbon